SpaceX Crew-3 was the fourth operational flight of a Crew Dragon spacecraft, and the third overall crewed orbital flight of the Commercial Crew Program. The mission successfully launched on 11 November 2021 at 02:03:31 UTC to the International Space Station. It was the maiden flight of Crew Dragon Endurance.

This launch brought the total number of humans who have been to space to more than 600 with Maurer (600) and Barron (601).

Name 
Crew Dragon capsules have been given names by their initial crews — Endeavour for the first, and Resilience for the second. On 7 October 2021, it was announced that the third capsule will be called Endurance. The name honors the SpaceX and NASA teams that endured through a pandemic, building the spacecraft and training the astronauts who flew it. The name also honors Endurance, the ship used by Shackleton's Imperial Trans-Antarctic Expedition. The three-masted vessel sank in 1915 after being bound in ice before reaching Antarctica.

Crew 
German ESA astronaut Matthias Maurer was selected first for the mission in September 2020. NASA astronauts Raja Chari and Thomas Marshburn were added on 14 December 2020 to the crew. The fourth seat was left open in anticipation that a Russian cosmonaut would take the seat, marking the beginning of a barter agreement that would see NASA and Roscosmos trade seats on the Soyuz and Commercial Crew Vehicles, although in April 2021 then-acting NASA administration Steve Jurczyk said that this agreement would be unlikely to start until after Crew-3 had launched. The fourth seat was assigned to Kayla Barron in May 2021.

Chari is the first rookie astronaut to command a NASA space mission since the Skylab 4 crew blasted off to the Skylab space station in 1973. Gerald Carr, who had not flown in space before, led a three-man crew on an 84-day flight on the Skylab. This was also the first spaceflight for Maurer and Barron.

The first astronauts of this NASA Astronaut Group 22 (nicknamed The Turtles) to fly to space, Raja Chari and Kayla Barron on SpaceX Crew-3 took a stuffed turtle as zero-g indicator, to pay a tribute to their astronaut group. Additionally, to include the other crew members on board, Matthias Maurer and Tom Marshburn, the turtle was named "Pfau", a German word meaning "Peacock" for Matthias Maurer who is German, and for Tom Marshburn who was part of NASA Astronaut Group 19 (nicknamed The Peacocks).

Mission 

The third SpaceX operational mission in the Commercial Crew Program was originally scheduled to launch on 31 October 2021. However, it was delayed to 3 November 2021 due to unfavorable weather in the Atlantic Ocean, and then further delayed to 7 November 2021 due to a minor medical issue with one of the astronauts. Due to expected bad weather, it was again delayed to 9 November 2021.

Due to the launch delays, NASA decided to return the astronauts from Crew-2 before Crew-3 launched, thus being the first Crew Dragon indirect handover of space station crews. SpaceX Crew-2 departed the station on 8 November 2021 and splashed down on 9 November 2021. SpaceX Crew-3 mission launched from Cape Canaveral on 11 November 2021 at 02:03:31 UTC.

The return of Crew-3 was delayed multiple times, from April 2022 to early May. Undocking happened on 5 May (05:20 UTC), with splashdown occurring the following day after spending 176 days in space.

The European segment of the mission is called "Cosmic Kiss".

See also 
 Dragon C206 Endeavour
 Dragon C207 Resilience
 Dragon C210 Endurance
 Dragon C212 Freedom

References 

SpaceX Dragon 2
Spacecraft launched in 2021
SpaceX payloads contracted by NASA
SpaceX human spaceflights
2021 in the United States
Fully civilian crewed orbital spaceflights
Spacecraft which reentered in 2022